Geoffrey Lehmann (born 28 June 1940) is an Australian poet, children's writer, and tax lawyer. Lehmann grew up in McMahon's Point, Sydney, and attended the Shore School in North Sydney. He graduated in arts and law from the University of Sydney in 1960 and 1963 respectively. In 1961, he demonstrated in a student newspaper article that fellow student Robert Hughes had published plagiarised poetry by Terence Tiller and others, and a drawing by Leonard Baskin.

Lehmann was the first Australian poet to be published by the London publishing house Faber and Faber. He received the 2015 Prime Minister's Literary Award for poetry.

Lehmann has worked as a solicitor in his own small law firm, as an academic lawyer at the University of New South Wales, and as a corporate tax lawyer, having retired from PricewaterhouseCoopers.  He continues to write as a literary reviewer for The Australian newspaper.

Bibliography

Poetry

Comic Australian Verse (1972) Editor
Conversation with a Rider (1972)
Selected Poems (1976)
Ross' Poems (1978)
Nero's Poems: Translations of the public and private poems of the Emperor Nero (1981)
Children's Games (1990)
Spring Forest (1992)
Collected Poems (1997)
Baking at Night and Other Poems (2003)
Poems 1957-2013 (2014)

Novels
A Spring Day in Autumn (1974)

Children's fiction
The Balloon Farmer (1994) with Betty Greenhatch
Sky Boy (2001) with Caroline Magerl

Non-fiction
Australian Primitive Painters (1974) editor, art

Edited
Hermes (1962)
Comic Australian Verse (1972)
The Younger Australian Poets (1983) editor with Robert Gray 
The Flight of the Emu (1990)
Australian Poetry in the Twentieth Century (1991) editor with Robert Gray
Australian Poetry Since 1788 (2011) editor with Robert Gray

Book reviews

References

External links
 At Amazon.com
 Children's books
 List of books at Google Books

1940 births
Living people
Australian poets
Quadrant (magazine) people
People educated at Sydney Church of England Grammar School
Tax lawyers